This is a list of personalities or groups who appeared from 1955–1960 on ABC-TV's Ozark Jubilee, renamed Country Music Jubilee and later Jubilee USA. A year(s) is included where documented, but some performers may have made other appearances. This list includes cast members and guests. An asterisk (*) indicates appearances on "Junior Jubilee."

Roy Acuff and the Smoky Mountain Boys (1958, 60)
Eddy Akridge, singing rodeo rider (1956)
Lennie Aleshire (1955–60)
All American Quartet (1955)
Red Allen (1959)
Rex Allen (1955–58, 60)
Fran Allison (1955–57, 60)
Bill Anderson (1959–60)
Annie Lou and Danny (1955–57)
The Arden Sisters (1956)
Suzi Arden (1955–59)
Eddy Arnold (1955–1960)
Charline Arthur (1955)
Chet Atkins (1957–58)
Gene Autry (1956, 60)
The Ballentines, harmonica players (1956) 
Molly Bee (1960)
Carl Belew (1959)
Jimmy Belken,  fiddle (1955–60)
Boyd Bennett (1957–58)
Roger Berger
Mo. Lt. Gov. Jim Blair (1956)
The Bob Bohm Trio (1960) 
Johnny Bond (1955–56)
Pat Boone (1955–59)
Chuck Bowers (1955–58)
Margie Bowes
The Braga Sisters (1959)
Uncle Cyp and Aunt Sap Brasfield (1955–60)
Rod Brasfield (1957)
Mike Breid (1955–56)*
Mrs. Robert E. Broach, 1956 Polio Mother of the Year (1956)
Cecil Brower (1955–60)
Billy Brown (1960)
Jim Brown (1955, 57)
Jim Ed and Maxine Brown (1955–56)
The Browns (1956–57)  
Slim Bryant and his Wildcats (1959)
The Bullfrogs (Tadpoles' parents) (1955)
Dave Bunker (1958)
Bill Burke, accordion (1955)
Smiley Burnette (1955, 57–60)
Shirley Caddell (1955–57)
Ginger Callahan, banjo (1955)
Barbara Cameron (1957) 
Archie Campbell (1959)
Anita Carter (1957)
June Carter (1958)
The Carter Sisters (1956)*
Bill Carlisle (1956)
The Carlisles (1956, 59)
Thumbs Carllile (1956–58)
Colleen Carroll
Little Johnny Edwards (1955, 56 
Joe Carson (1957)
Martha Carson (1958, 60)
Johnny Cash (1956, 58–60)
Curly Chalker (1955–60)
Pat Charles (1960)
The Chelette Sisters (1956) 
Don Cherry (1960)
Buddy Childers (1960) 
Lew Childre (1955, 57, 59)
Christ Episcopal Church children’s choir, Springfield (1960)
Sanford Clark (1957)
Tenn. Gov. Frank Clement (1956)
Patsy Cline (1956–60)
The Collins Kids (1960)
Tommy Collins (1955)  
The Commodores Quartet (1955)
The Compton Brothers (1956)*
Johnny Cook (1956)
Wilma Lee and Stoney Cooper (1959)
Cowboy Copas (1960)
Ray Crespin, Seventeen fashion editor (1956)
Kim Crow (1959)
Johnny Dakota (1955)
"Ragtime" Bob Darch (1960)
Jimmie Davis and the Plainsmen (1956–57, 59)
Rufe Davis (1956, 60)
The Davis Sisters (1955)
Skeeter Davis (1956, 59)
Eddie Dean (1955)
Jimmy Dean (1956)
Dee and Patty (1958) 
Arnie Derksen (1959)
Curly Detwyler’s Hicks and Chicks, square dancers (1955)
Little Jimmy Dickens (1957)
Dottie Dillard
Rusty Draper (1956, 60)
Jimmy Driftwood (1959, 60)
Roy Drusky (1960)
Arlie Duff (1954–55)
Doug Dugger
The Duke of Paducah (1955, 57)
Tommy Duncan (1956)
"Little Johnny" Edwards (1955)
Gary Ellison, caller (1956–60)
Patsy Elshire (1955)
Emory University roller-skating square dancers (1956, 59)
James "Rusty" Estes (1955–60)
Rita Faye (1955)
Terry Fell (1955)
Buster Fellows, fiddle (1955–60)
Shug Fisher (1955–57, 60)
The Five Phils (1956)
Linda Flanagan (1956)
The Foggy River Boys (1955–60)
Betty Foley (1959)
Jenny Lou Foley (1959)
Red Foley (1955–60)
Howdy Forrester
Buford Foster, caller (1955–60)
Ralph Foster (1960)
The Four Bees (1959)
The Four Jacks
Wally Fowler (1956)
Curly Fox (1959)
Tillman Franks (1955, 59)
Dallas Frazier (1955)
Frisco Joe, banjo (1956)
Lefty Frizzell (1955)
The Frontiersmen (1960)
Johnny Gailey (1955–60)
Alfred W. "Red" Gale (1956–57)
Wanda Gann (1957)
Hank Garland (1955–60)
Red Garrett (1956)
Jimmy Gately (1956–57, 1959)
The Gays (1960)
Don Gibson (1959–60)
Terry Gilkyson and The Easy Riders (1958)
Johnny Gimble
Glen Glenn (1956)
Lonnie Glosson (1957)
Terry Gott (1956, 59)*
Billy Grammer (1960)
Betty Ann Grove (1956–57, 59)
Bobby Grove (1956)
Charlie Haden (1955–57)
Roy Hall (1956)
The Hames Sisters (1958)
George Hamilton IV (1959)
June Hamra
The Hardin Trio (1956)*
The Harmonettes (1959, 1960)
Bill Hart, ventriloquist (1956)
The Harmoniers Quartet (1958, 1959)
Hawkshaw Hawkins (1956)
Speedy Haworth (1955–60)
Bobby Helms (1957, 59)
U.S. Sen. Tom Hennings (1956)
Jenny Herrell (1959)
Goldie Hill (1955, 57)
Charlie Hodge (1955–57)
Salty Holmes (1955, 59)
Homer and Jethro (1957–58)
Libby Horne (1955–58)*
Johnny Horton (1956–57, 60)
David Houston (1957)
Jan Howard (1960)
Shirlee Hunter (1957–58)
Ferlin Husky (1958, 60)
The Imperial Quartet (1955) 
Bud Isaacs (1956)
Stonewall Jackson
Tommy Jackson (1955)
Wanda Jackson (1955–58)
Sonny James (1955–58)
Norma Jean (1955–58, 60)
Jig-A-Longs square dancers
Jimmy & Johnny (1956)
Cousin Jody, comic guitarist (1959)
Johnnie & Jack (1959)
Betty Johnson (1955–56, 59)
George Jones (1959)
Grandpa Jones (1958)
Little Montie Jones (1955)
The Jordanaires (1958)
The Jubilaires (1960)
Judy Kay (1958–60)
L. D. Keller, caller (1955–1960)
The Kern Sisters (1960)
The Anita Kerr Singers (1960)
Nelson King, disc jockey (1956) 
Pee Wee King (1957–58, 60)
Sid King and the Five Strings (1955)
Jack Kingston (1958) 
Twinkle Knessley (1956)*
The La Dell Sisters (1956)
The Lamppost Four (1959)
Bobby Lanera (1956)*
Roy Lanham
Snooky Lanson (1960)
Brenda Lee (1955–60)*
Rosalie Leis, beauty queen (1956)
Merl Lindsay (1957)
Hank Locklin (1955–56, 58)
Little Eller Long (1957–58)
Lonzo and Oscar (1959–60) 
Bobby Lord (1955–60)
The Louvin Brothers (1958)
Jim Lowe (1955, 57)
Lulu Belle and Scotty (1956)
Ray Lunceford (1955)
Mary Lunell (1957)  
Judy Lynn (1956)
Leon McAuliffe and His Cimarron Boys (1955, 58, 60)
Kathleen McClung (1956)*
The McCormick Brothers (1955)
The McCoys (1958)
Skeets McDonald
Eva Kay "Cookie" McKinney (1957–58)*
Bill McMains, Conn staff organist (1957) 
Warner Mack (1957, 59)
The Maddox Brothers and Rose (1955)
Johnny Manson, fiddle
Bryan "Doc" Martin (1955–60)
Grady Martin (1955–60)
Hank Martin (1960)
Janis Martin (1957)
Sonny Martin (1956)*
Wink Martindale (1959)
Alma May, 1956 Cotton Bag Sewing Queen (1956)
Will Mercer (1958)
The Miller Brothers Band (1957–58)
Frankie Miller (1959)
Johnny Miller, one-man band (1957–58)
Mike Miller, banjo (1957)
The Missouri Ramblers (1955), square dancers
Paul Mitchell (1955–60)
The Mobleys (1956)*
Patsy Montana (1957)
Melba Montgomery (1960)
Bob Moore (1955–60)
George Morgan (1957–59)
Billy Joe Morris (1956–57)*
Harold Morrison (1955–60)
"Hairless Joe" Morrison, banjo (1955) 
Stan Musial (1956)
Bobby Myers (1956)*
Marlene Olsen, 1957 March of Dimes poster child
Jimmy C. Newman (1955–56, 59)
Penny Nichols (1954–55)
Peggy Norris (1957)
Mattie O'Neal (1955)
The Oklahoma Wranglers (1955)
Bashful Brother Oswald
Buck Owens (1960)
Dusty Owens (1956, 60)
The Ozark Playboys (1955)
The Ozark Sashayers
Betty Patterson (1960)
[ Pat Patterson] (1955, 59)
Minnie Pearl (1957–58, 60)
Carl Perkins and Perkins Brothers Band (1956–57)
The Philharmonics (1955–60)
Webb Pierce (1955–58)
Pete Pike (1955)
The Four Pitchikers (1959–60)
Polly Possum (1957)
Ray Price (1957, 59)
The Promenaders (1955–60)
Sammy Pruitt (1960)
Ted Rains
Marvin Rainwater (1955–60)
Rascals in Rhythm (1957)
Shirley Raye
Jim Reeves (1955, 58–59)
Duncan Renaldo (1957)
Don Reno (1955)
Jack Reno (1955)
George Rhodes (1960)
Jimmie Riddle
Bill Ring (1955–60)
Tex Ritter (1955–57, 60)
The Little Roberts Sisters (1958) 
Marty Robbins (1958)
Rita Robbins (1956)
Ginnie Rogers
Smokey Rogers (1958)
Mimi Roman (1956)
Carla Rowe (1959)
Dido Rowley (1955)
Harmonica Bill Russell (1956)
Floyd "Goo Goo" Rutledge (1955–60)
Jimmie Selph (1955)
Joe Settlemires, Ozark Jubilee Band (1957)
"Billy" Dale Sexton (1956)*
Jean Shepard (1955–58)
U.S. Rep. Dewey Short (1955)
Lu Ann Simms (1957)
Margie Singleton (1959–60)
Jimmie Skinner (1955, 58)
Merv Shiner (1959)
Joe Slattery (1955–60)
Bonnie Sloan (1955)
Arthur Smith (1956)
Carl Smith (1959–60)
Smokey Bear (1956)
The Solomons, 1956 March of Dimes poster family (1956)
Tommy Sosebee (1955–57)
Red Sovine (1955, 57)
Clyde Wayne Spears (1956)*
Sammy Spencer
The Spider & The Fly, comedy duo (1956)*
Pete Stamper (1955–57)
Jed Starkey (1955, 59)
Rocky Starr (1959)
Jon and Sandra Steele (1956)
"Texas" Bill Strength (1955–57)
Stringbean (1958, 60)
Redd Stewart (1955, 59–60)
Wynn Stewart (1960)
The Sunshine Boys (1955)
U.S. Sen. Stuart Symington (1956)
Jim Symington (1958)
The (Lake of the Ozark) Tadpoles (1956–60)
Tom Tall (1955)
Dub Taylor (1956–57)
Vonnie Taylor (1955–56)
Zed Tennis (1955–60)
Gordon Terry (1960)
Tex Terry (1958)
Jeannie Thomas (1960)
Hank Thompson and the Brazos Valley Boys (1957, 60)
Tommy Thompson, guitarist (1959)
Casey Tibbs (1955) 
Mel Tillis
Floyd Tillman (1958–59)
Mitchell Torok (1956)
Merle Travis (1955, 59–60)
The Trumpeteers (1955) 
Ernest Tubb (1957–58)
Justin Tubb (1955)
Barney Tucker (1956)
Wesley and Marilyn Tuttle, father-daughter (1956)
Conway Twitty (1958) 
T. Texas Tyler (1957)
June Valli (1960)
Leroy Van Dyke (1955–60)
The Vernon Family (1959)
Gene Vincent and His Blue Caps (1957)
The Wagon Wheelers (1956–60)
Porter Wagoner (1955–58)
Jimmy Wakely (1956–58, 60)
Billy Walker (1955–59)
Cindy Walker (1958–59)
Don Warden (1955–57)
Luke Warmwater (1955)
The Weaver Brothers 
June Webb (1960)
Ardis Wells and Her Rhythm Ranch Girls (1957)
Kitty Wells (1958)
Speedy West (1955–58)
Tabby West (1955–56, 58)
Ern Westmore (1955)
The Westport Kids (1955) 
Onie Wheeler (1956)
Slim Whitman (1955)
The Whirli-jiggers (1956–57)*
Bob White (1955–60)
The Wilburn Brothers (1956, 58, 60)
John "Bucky" Wilkin (1956, 58)*
Audrey Williams (1956–57)
Tex Williams (1957–58)
Bob Wills and His Texas Playboys (1957, 59)
Brad Wilson (1956)*
Earl Wilson (1956)
Jim Wilson (1955–57)
Slim Wilson (1955–60)
Bill Wimberly and His Country Rhythm Boys (1955–60)
Mac Wiseman (1955–1956)
Joe Wolverton] (1957)
Del Wood (1957)
Marion Worth
Darlene Wright (1959)
The York Brothers (1955)
The Yost Sisters 
Faron Young (1958, 60)

Notes

References

The Billboard (1955–1960), Vols. 67–72
Country Music Jubilee Souvenir Picture Album (third edition, 1957)
 Barry McCloud (1995) Definitive Country: The Ultimate Encyclopedia of Country Music and Its Performers, 
.

Ozark Jubilee Souvenir Picture Album (first edition, 1955)
Ozark Jubilee Souvenir Picture Album (second edition, 1956), © Ozark Jubilee's Crossroads Store
Weekly program listings (1955–1960), TV Guide, Vols. 3–8

American country music